Mike Pringley (born May 22, 1976) is a former American football defensive end. He played for the Detroit Lions in 1999 and for the San Diego Chargers in 2000.

References

1976 births
Living people
American football defensive ends
Linden High School (New Jersey) alumni
North Carolina Tar Heels football players
Detroit Lions players
San Diego Chargers players
People from Linden, New Jersey
Players of American football from New Jersey
Sportspeople from Union County, New Jersey